The modern 24-hour clock, popularly referred to in the United States as military time, is the convention of timekeeping in which the day runs from midnight to midnight and is divided into 24 hours. This is indicated by the hours (and minutes) passed since midnight, from 0(:00) to 23(:59). This system, as opposed to the 12-hour clock, is the most commonly used time notation in the world today, and is used by the international standard ISO 8601.

A number of countries, particularly English-speaking, use the 12-hour clock, or a mixture of the 24- and 12-hour time systems. In countries where the 12-hour clock is dominant, some professions prefer to use the 24-hour clock. For example, in the practice of medicine, the 24-hour clock is generally used in documentation of care as it prevents any ambiguity as to when events occurred in a patient's medical history.

Description 

A time of day is written in the 24-hour notation in the form hh:mm (for example 01:23) or hh:mm:ss (for example, 01:23:45), where hh (00 to 23) is the number of full hours that have passed since midnight, mm (00 to 59) is the number of full minutes that have passed since the last full hour, and ss (00 to 59) is the number of seconds since the last full minute. In the case of a leap second, the value of ss may extend to 60. A leading zero is added for numbers under 10, but it is optional for the hours. The leading zero is very commonly used in computer applications, and always used when a specification requires it (for example, ISO 8601).

Where subsecond resolution is required, the seconds can be a decimal fraction; that is, the fractional part follows a decimal dot or comma, as in 01:23:45.678. The most commonly used separator symbol between hours, minutes and seconds is the colon, which is also the symbol used in ISO 8601. In the past, some European countries used the dot on the line as a separator, but most national standards on time notation have since then been changed to the international standard colon. In some contexts (including some computer protocols), no separator is used and times are written as, for example, "2359".

Midnight 00:00 and 24:00 

In the 24-hour time notation, the day begins at midnight, 00:00 or 0:00, and the last minute of the day begins at 23:59. Where convenient, the notation 24:00 may also be used to refer to midnight at the end of a given date — that is, 24:00 of one day is the same time as 00:00 of the following day.

The notation 24:00 mainly serves to refer to the exact end of a day in a time interval. A typical usage is giving opening hours ending at midnight (e.g. "00:00–24:00", "07:00–24:00"). Similarly, some bus and train timetables show 00:00 as departure time and 24:00 as arrival time. Legal contracts often run from the start date at 00:00 until the end date at 24:00.

While the 24-hour notation unambiguously distinguishes between midnight at the start (00:00) and end (24:00) of any given date, there is no commonly accepted distinction among users of the 12-hour notation. Style guides and military communication regulations in some English-speaking countries discourage the use of 24:00 even in the 24-hour notation, and recommend reporting times near midnight as 23:59 or 00:01 instead. Sometimes the use of 00:00 is also avoided. In variance with this, as of 2010, the correspondence manual for the United States Navy and United States Marine Corps formerly specified 0001 to 2400. The manual was updated in June 2015 to use 0000 to 2359.

Times after 24:00 

Time-of-day notations beyond 24:00 (such as 24:01 or 25:00 instead of 00:01 or 01:00) are not commonly used and not covered by the relevant standards. However, they have been used occasionally in some special contexts in the United Kingdom, France, Spain, Canada, Japan, South Korea, Hong Kong, and China where business hours extend beyond midnight, such as broadcast television production and scheduling. The GTFS public transport schedule listings file format has the concept of service days and expects times beyond 24:00 for trips that run after midnight.

Computer support 
In most countries, computers by default show the time in 24-hour notation. For example, Microsoft Windows and macOS activate the 12-hour notation by default only if a computer is in a handful of specific language and region settings. The 24-hour system is commonly used in text-based interfaces. POSIX programs such as ls default to displaying timestamps in 24-hour format.

Military time 

In American English, the term military time is a synonym for the 24-hour clock. In the US, the time of day is customarily given almost exclusively using the 12-hour clock notation, which counts the hours of the day as 12, 1, ..., 11 with suffixes a.m. and p.m. distinguishing the two diurnal repetitions of this sequence. The 24-hour clock is commonly used there only in some specialist areas (military, aviation, navigation, tourism, meteorology, astronomy, computing, logistics, emergency services, hospitals), where the ambiguities of the 12-hour notation are deemed too inconvenient, cumbersome, or dangerous.

Military usage, as agreed between the United States and allied English-speaking military forces, differs in some respects from other twenty-four-hour time systems:
No hours/minutes separator is used when writing the time, and a letter designating the time zone is appended (for example "0340Z").
Leading zeros are always written out and are required to be spoken, so 5:43 a.m. is spoken "zero five forty-three" (casually) or "zero five four three" (military radio), as opposed to "five forty-three" or "five four three".
Military time zones are lettered and given word designations from the NATO phonetic alphabet. For example, in US Eastern Standard Time (UTC−5), which is designated time zone R, 2:00 a.m. is written "0200R" and spoken "zero two hundred Romeo".
Local time is designated as zone J or "Juliett". "1200J" ("twelve hundred Juliett") is noon local time.
Greenwich Mean Time (GMT) or Coordinated Universal Time (UTC) is designated time zone Z, and thus called "Zulu time". (When used as a modern time zone, in practice, GMT and UTC coincide. For other purposes there may be a difference of about a second.)
Hours are always "hundred", never "thousand"; 1000 is "ten hundred" not "one thousand"; 2000 is "twenty hundred" not "two thousand".

History 

The first mechanical public clocks introduced in Italy were mechanical 24-hour clocks which counted the 24 hours of the day from one-half hour after sundown to the evening of the following day. The 24th hour was the last hour of day time.

From the 14th to the 17th century, two systems of time measurement competed in Europe:
 Italian (Bohemian, Old-Bohemian) hours (full-dial): 24 hours system with the day starting after sunset; on the static dial, the 24th hour was situated on the right side. In Italy, it was prevalently modified to a 4×6 hours system, but some 24hour dials lasted until the 19th century. The system has spread especially to the Alpine countries, Czech countries and Poland. In Bohemia, this system was finally banned only 1621 after the defeat on White Mountain. The Prague Astronomical Clock struck according to the Old Bohemian Clock until its destruction in 1945. The variant with counting from dawn is also rarely documented and used, e.g. on a 16th-century cabinet clock in the Vienna Art-History Museum.
 German (Gallic) hours (half-dial): 2×12 hour system starting at midnight and restarted at noon. It is typical with the 12-hour dial with 12 at the top. 
The modern 24-hour system is a late-19th century adaptation of the German midnight-starting system, and then prevailed in the world with the exception of some Anglophone countries.

Striking clocks had to produce 300 strokes each day, which required a lot of rope, and wore out the mechanism quickly, so some localities switched to ringing sequences of 1 to 12 twice (156 strokes), or even 1 to 6 repeated four times (84 strokes).

After missing a train while travelling in Ireland in 1876 because a printed schedule listed p.m. instead of a.m., Sir Sandford Fleming proposed a single 24-hour clock for the entire world, located at the centre of the Earth, not linked to any surface meridian — a predecessor to Coordinated Universal Time. He was an early proponent of using the 24-hour clock as part of a programme to reform timekeeping, which also included establishing time zones and a standard prime meridian. The Canadian Pacific Railway was among the first organizations to adopt the 24-hour clock, at midsummer 1886.

At the International Meridian Conference in 1884, American lawyer and astronomer Lewis M. Rutherfurd proposed:

This resolution was adopted by the conference.

A report by a government committee in the United Kingdom noted Italy as the first country among those mentioned to adopt 24-hour time nationally, in 1893. Other European countries followed: France adopted it in 1912 (the French army in 1909), followed by Denmark (1916), and Greece (1917). By 1920, Spain, Portugal, Belgium, and Switzerland had switched, followed by Turkey (1925), and Germany (1927). By the early 1920s, many countries in Latin America had also adopted the 24-hour clock. Some of the railways in India had switched before the outbreak of the war.

During World War I, the British Royal Navy adopted the 24-hour clock in 1915, and the Allied armed forces followed soon after, with the British Army switching officially in 1918. The Canadian armed forces first started to use the 24-hour clock in late 1917. In 1920, the United States Navy was the first United States organization to adopt the system; the United States Army, however, did not officially adopt the 24-hour clock until July 1, 1942.

The use of the 24-hour clock in the United Kingdom has grown steadily since the beginning of the 20th century, although attempts to make the system official failed more than once. In 1934, the British Broadcasting Corporation (BBC) switched to the 24-hour clock for broadcast announcements and programme listings. The experiment was halted after five months following a lack of enthusiasm from the public, and the BBC continued using the 12-hour clock. In the same year, Pan American World Airways Corporation and Western Airlines in the United States both adopted the 24-hour clock. In modern times, the BBC uses a mixture of both the 12-hour and the 24-hour clock. British Rail, London Transport, and the London Underground switched to the 24-hour clock for timetables in 1964. A mixture of the 12- and 24-hour clocks similarly prevails in other English-speaking Commonwealth countries: French speakers have adopted the 24-hour clock in Canada much more broadly than English speakers, and Australia also uses both systems.

See also 

 12-hour clock
 24-hour analog dial
 Clock
 Date and time representation by country
 Decimal time
 Hindu units of time
 Italian six-hour clock
 List of military time zones
 Metric time
 Thai six-hour clock
 Time
 Traditional Chinese timekeeping

Notes

References

External links 

 Counting Time: a brief history of the 24-hour clock (free e-book)

Date and time representation
Time measurement systems